An illegal agreement under the common law of contract, is one that the court will not enforce because the purpose of the agreement is to achieve an illegal end. The illegal end must result from performance of the contract itself. The classic example of such an agreement is a contract for murder.

The illegality of a contract depends on (1) the law of the country governing the contract, and (2) the law of the place of performance. Different rules will apply depending on the law of the relevant country(ies).

However, a contract that requires only legal performance on the part of each party, such as the sale of packs of cards to a known gambler, where gambling is illegal, will nonetheless be enforceable. A contract directly linked to the gambling act itself, such as paying off gambling debts (see proximate cause), however, will not meet the legal standards of enforceability.  Therefore, an employment contract between a blackjack dealer and a speakeasy manager, is an example of an illegal agreement and the employee has no valid claim to his anticipated wages if gambling is illegal under that jurisdiction.

In Bovard v. American Horse Enterprises (1988), the California Court of Appeal for the Third District refused to enforce a contract for payment of promissory notes used for the purchase of a company that manufactured drug paraphernalia. Although the items sold were not actually illegal, the court refused to enforce the contract for public policy concerns.

In Canada, one cited case of lack of enforceability based on illegality is Royal Bank of Canada v. Newell (1997 NSCA 196), in which a woman forged her husband's signature on 40 cheques, totalling over $58,000. To protect her from prosecution, her husband signed a letter of intent prepared by the bank in which he agreed to assume "all liability and responsibility" for the forged cheques. However, the agreement was unenforceable, and was struck down by the courts, because of its essential goal, which was to "stifle a criminal prosecution". Because of the contract's illegality, and as a result voided status, the bank was forced to return the payments made by the husband.

Contracts in restraint of trade are a variety of illegal contracts and generally will not be enforced unless they are reasonable in the interests of the contracting parties and the 
public.

Contracts in restraint of trade if proved to be reasonable can be enforced.  When restraint is placed on an ex-employee, the court will consider the geographical limits, what the employee knows and the extent of the duration.  Restraint imposed on a vendor of business must be reasonable and is binding if there is a genuine seal of goodwill.  Under common law, contracts to fix prices are legal. Sole supplier ("solus") agreements are legal if reasonable. Contracts which contravene public policy are void.

See also
 In pari delicto
 Nemo auditur propriam turpitudinem allegans

References

Contract law